Psalm 117 is the 117th psalm of the Book of Psalms, beginning in English in the King James Version: "O praise the LORD, all ye nations: praise him, all ye people." In Latin, it is known as Laudate Dominum. Consisting of only two verses, Psalm 117 is the shortest psalm and also the shortest chapter in the whole Bible. It is joined with Psalm 118 in the manuscripts of the Hebraist scholars Benjamin Kennicott and Giovanni Bernardo De Rossi.

In the slightly different numbering system in the Greek Septuagint and the Latin Vulgate version of the Bible, this psalm is Psalm 116.

Text

With just two verses and seventeen words and 62 characters in Hebrew (29 in v1 + 33 in v2 is 62), it is the shortest psalm in the Book of Psalms. It is also the shortest chapter in the whole Bible. It is the 595th of the 1,189 chapters of the King James Version of the Bible, making it the middle chapter of this version.

In Hebrew, it is an acrostic poem and is one of the so-called Egyptian Hallel prayers.

Hebrew Bible version

King James Version

Uses

Judaism 
Psalm 117 is one of six psalms (113-118) of which Hallel is composed. On all days when Hallel is recited, this psalm is recited in its entirety.

Christianity 
In Psalm 117, the gentiles are invited to join in praise of God. Christians view this as a fulfillment of God's promise of mercy to the gentiles, pointing to God's promise that all nations would be blessed in the seed of Abraham, who they believe is Christ, as described in the Letter to the Galatians.  says "Now to Abraham and his seed were the promises made. He saith not, And to seeds, as of many; but as of one, And to thy seed, which is Christ." Verse 1 is quoted in Romans .

Catholicism 
In the Catholic Church, the Rule of Saint Benedict assigns this psalm (116 in the Vulgate) to the Office of Vespers on Monday. Saint Benedict of Nursia generally used four psalms in vespers, but because of the shortness of this psalm, he added a fifth when it was used. It is currently used in the Liturgy of the Hours on Saturday of Weeks I and III. The psalm may be sung after Benediction of the Blessed Sacrament, a ritual performed in Catholic and some Anglican churches.

Musical settings 
 Psalm 117, known by the opening words in Latin as Laudate dominum (translated "O, Praise the Lord" or "Praise ye the Lord"), has been set to music by a number of composers, including William Byrd, Johann Sebastian Bach Lobet den Herrn, alle Heiden, BWV 230, Michel Richard Delalande, Marc-Antoine Charpentier, (6 settings), H.152, H.159, H.182, H.214, H.223, H.227, Wolfgang Amadeus Mozart and Robert Strassburg. Alan Hovhaness set portions of it, along with Psalm 27, in his 1935 work The God of Glory Thundereth. More recently, it has been set by the Swedish composer Fredrik Sixten. The psalm also forms the introduction of the 90s pop song Happy Nation by Swedish pop group Ace of Base, and a popular arrangement from the Taizé community.

References

External links 

 
 
 Psalms Chapter 117 text in Hebrew and English, mechon-mamre.org
 Text of Psalm 117 according to the 1928 Psalter
United States Conference of Catholic Bishops, Praise the LORD, all you nations! Extol him, all you peoples! text and footnotes, usccb.org 
 Psalm 117:1 introduction and text, biblestudytools.com
 Psalm 117 – Calling All Peoples to Praise the LORD enduringword.com
 Psalm 117 / Refrain: Alleluia. Church of England
 Psalm 117 at biblegateway.com
 Charles Spurgeon: Psalm 117 detailed commentary, archive.spurgeon.org
 
 
 Laudate Dominum (Psalm 117) (William Byrd) - Midi files and PDF scores by ChoralWiki
 Laudate Dominum (Psalm 117) (Mozart) - Midi files and PDF scores by ChoralWiki
 Laudate Dominum (Psalm 150) (Ronald Corp) - Excerpt, programme note and PDF score

117
Hallel